The Memorial to the Murdered Jews of Hanover is located in Hanover, Germany, on Opernplatz, one of the city's central squares. It was designed by the Italian artist Michelangelo Pistoletto and erected in 1994 on the initiative of the Memoriam Association and financed through individual donations. The memorial is adjacent to Hanover's Opera House and commemorates the more than 6,800 Jews of Hanover who were murdered by the Nazis in the Holocaust. To date, 1,935 names have been carved in stone. Their age at the time of deportation was added to the names of the deportees, for the other victims the birth year was added. As far as is known, the subsequent fate of each individual victim was recorded. If the place of death could not be determined, "missing" was noted, as was customary elsewhere.

History 

The history of the Jews in Hanover up to the end of Nazi Germany is summarized by a central inscription at the memorial as follows:
Before the building was erected, there were years of controversial discussions about the pros and cons of such a monument. Finally, on the initiative of the Memoriam e.V. association, enough private donations came together to be able to hand over the building to the public on 9 October 1994.

On the day of the dedication, State Rabbi Henry Brandt recited the following prayer:
At the inauguration in 1994 the names of 1,890 victims were known. Due to further research another 25 names could be added in 1997, another 20 in 2004.

In mid-2012, the memorial had been vandalised by unknown people and carelessly soiled with chewing gum. Following a letter from the chairman of the Jewish Community of Lower Saxony, Michael Fürst, to the then Lord Mayor Stephan Weil and an intensive clean-up of the memorial to restore the dignity of the site, a separate information board was erected in 2013, explaining the situation on both sides. During an event organized by the Department of Education and Qualification of the State Capital, Project Remembrance Culture, a memorial was unveiled on 25th October 2013 Ingrid Wettberg, Chairwoman of the Liberal Jewish Community, together with Marlis Drevermann, Head of the Department of Culture and Education, unveiled the board in front of numerous guests from the political, cultural and historical world of the City of Hanover, including Holocaust survivors and contemporary witnesses Salomon Finkelstein and Henry Korman. During the event, pupils of the St. Ursula School recalled the fates of individual Hanoverians who were victims of the Holocaust.

References 

Holocaust memorials in Germany
1990s architecture
Antisemitism in Germany
Stone sculptures in Germany